Elk-sedge may refer to:

 Carex garberi, a species of sedge native to northern North America.
 Carex geyeri , a species of sedge native to western North America from British Columbia to California to Colorado
 Cladium mariscus, a species of flowering plant in the sedge family native to temperate Europe and Asia
 Algiz or Eolh-secg (elk-sedge), a rune of the Elder Futhark and Futhorc runic alphabets